The FA Cup 1986-87 is the 106th season of the world's oldest football knockout competition; The Football Association Challenge Cup, or FA Cup for short. The large number of clubs entering the tournament from lower down the English football league system meant that the competition started with a number of preliminary and qualifying rounds. The 28 victorious teams from the Fourth Round Qualifying progressed to the First Round Proper.

Preliminary round

Ties

Replays

2nd replays

1st qualifying round

Ties

Replays

2nd replays

2nd qualifying round

Ties

Replays

2nd replay

3rd replay

3rd qualifying round

Ties

Replays

2nd replays

4th qualifying round
The teams that given byes to this round are Enfield, Weymouth, Wealdstone, Bath City, Boston United, Maidstone United, Nuneaton Borough, Dagenham, Wycombe Wanderers, Dartford, Yeovil Town, Bishop's Stortford, Macclesfield, Windsor & Eton, Bognor Regis Town, Farnborough Town, Whitby Town, Chelmsford City, Slough Town and V S Rugby.

Ties

Replays

2nd replay

3rd replay

1986-87 FA Cup
See 1986-87 FA Cup for details of the rounds from the First Round Proper onwards.

References

External links
Football Club History Database: FA Cup 1986-87
FA Cup Past Results

Qual
FA Cup qualifying rounds